Shane Robin Clarke (born 7 November 1987) is an English footballer who plays for Lincoln United, where he plays as a midfielder.

Clarke notably played professionally in the Football League during a four-year spell with Lincoln City. He has since played the rest of his career at Non-League level for Gateshead, Boston United, Gainsborough Trinity, Spalding United, Worksop Town and Tamworth.

Early life
Clarke was born in Lincoln, England.

Playing career

Lincoln City
Clarke is a product of the club's centre of excellence which he joined in February 2002. In March 2004, he was one of five players who accepted a three-year scholarship with the Imps, commencing at the start of the 2004–05 season. Of the five, three would go on to forge professional careers: Clarke, Jack Hobbs and Scott Loach. In January 2006, Clarke joined Stamford on work experience with the scholarship system reverting to two rather than three years, Clarke was offered professional terms with the club at the end of his second year and he signed his first, one-year, professional contract in July 2006.

He started his Lincoln career as an unused substitute against Grimsby Town in a Football League Trophy match. He then played 11 games and was used as a substitute 5 times. His second Football League game, a 3–1 home defeat to Rotherham United on 12 January 2008, saw Clarke red-carded for a last minute lunge on Mark Hudson resulting in a three-match ban. However his performances after making his debut saw him rewarded with a one-year extension to his contract. On 30 April 2009 he agreed a new two-year contract with the club signing the contract the following day.

In May 2010, Clarke was placed on the Lincoln City transfer list by manager Chris Sutton, and on 31 August 2010 agreed a deal with the club to have his contract cancelled.

Gateshead
On 6 October 2010, Clarke signed an initial one-month contract with Conference National side Gateshead. Clarke made his debut for Gateshead as a second-half substitute against AFC Wimbledon on 16 October 2010. Clarke was released by Gateshead on 8 November 2010.

Boston United
On 19 November 2010 he joined Boston United and was judged to be man-of-the-match on his debut for the club, a 2–1 home FA Trophy victory over Gainsborough Trinity the following day. He departed the club following the 1–0 home Conference North defeat to A.F.C. Telford United on 12 February 2011 after being offered a trial with MLS side Chicago Fire.
He linked up with the club for the second phase of their pre-season training, appearing in games against Florida Gulf Coast University and New York Red Bulls, before being released from his trial on 28 February 2011.

He returned to Boston United, appearing as an unused substitute in the club's 1–0 defeat at Solihull Moors on 26 March 2011 and maintaining a place in the squad until the end of the season. He was offered terms by the club for the 2011–2012 season but turned these down in order to join Gainsborough Trinity.

Gainsborough Trinity
Clarke signed for Gainsborough Trinity in June 2011. During the 2011–12 season, Clarke formed a formidable midfield partnership with Jonathan D'Laryea, and the pair were influential in helping Trinity to secure a National League North play-off position, finishing in 5th place. Trinity would go on to reach the play-off final, defeating Halifax Town 3–2 over two legs, with Clarke scoring the only goal in the second leg to send Trinity through to the final. In the summer of 2012, Clark agreed to sign for another year with Trinity.

Worksop Town
In June 2013 he signed for Worksop Town.

Tamworth
On 10 June 2014, Clarke, and his Worksop Town teammate Leon Mettam joined Conference North side Tamworth.

Boston United
Clarke rejoined Boston United in May 2016, but suffered an injury-stricken season with the Pilgrims, being ruled out for the first half of the season after suffering a second Achilles injury in quick succession. He was already set to miss the opening month of the campaign, but was subsequently eliminated from action until at least January 2017. Clarke was one of eight released at the end of the season, after making only 11 appearances.

Gainsborough Trinity
Returning to Gainsborough Trinity for a second spell following his release from Lincolnshire rivals Boston United, Clarke was unveiled as one of Dave Frecklington's first summer signings in May 2017, along with Craig King. Clarke scored his first goal on his return on 19 August against Harrogate Town.

Lincoln United
In June 2022, Clarke joined Lincoln United.

Personal life
Clarke has a son called Gabriel, who was born on 1 March 2011.

Career statistics

References

External links

Lincoln City F.C. Official Archive Profile

1987 births
Living people
English footballers
Sportspeople from Lincoln, England
Association football midfielders
Lincoln City F.C. players
Stamford A.F.C. players
Gateshead F.C. players
Boston United F.C. players
Gainsborough Trinity F.C. players
Worksop Town F.C. players
Tamworth F.C. players
Spalding United F.C. players
Grantham Town F.C. players
Lincoln United F.C. players
English Football League players
National League (English football) players
Northern Premier League players